Giuseppe "Pino" Cerami (28 April 1922 – 20 September 2014) was a Belgian road bicycle racer. He joined the professional peloton in 1946 as an independent. Born in Misterbianco, Sicily, Italy he was naturalised as a Belgian on 16 March 1956.

Cerami won the 1960 Paris–Roubaix Classic with Tino Sabbadini of France second and Miguel Poblet of Spain in third place. Cerami also won La Flèche Wallonne Classic in 1960. Cerami was 3rd in the 1960 World Championship Road Race behind Rik Van Looy of Belgium and Frenchman André Darrigade. At the 1963 Tour de France, Cerami won the 9th stage at 41 years old; Cerami is the oldest Tour de France stage winner ever.

Since 1964 the Grand Prix Pino Cerami professional cycling race has taken place every year in Belgium.
Cerami died on 20 September 2014 after a long illness.

Major results

1951
 3rd stage Tour of Belgium
 5th stage Tour of Belgium
1954
1st Ninove
 12th stage Tour of Europe
 13th stage Tour of Europe
1957
 1st stage Tour of Belgium
 General Classification - Tour of Belgium
1958
 2nd stage Tour de Picardie
1959
 3rd stage Tour de Luxembourg
1960
 Paris–Roubaix
 Flèche Wallonne
1961
 Paris–Brussels
 Brabantse Pijl
1963
 9th stage Tour de France

Tour de France 
1949 - did not finish
1957 - 35th
1958 - did not finish
1962 - 81st
1963 - did not finish; winner 9th stage

References

External links 
Pino Cerami's palmares at memoire-du-cyclisme.net (in French)
Pino Cerami at cyclinghalloffame.com

1922 births
2014 deaths
Sportspeople from the Province of Catania
Belgian male cyclists
Belgian Tour de France stage winners
Walloon sportspeople
Naturalised citizens of Belgium
People from Misterbianco
Cyclists from Sicily